Koh Rong is a coastal town in Sihanoukville Province of Cambodia. It was formed from the islands of Koh Rong and Koh Rong Sanloem by a sub-decree issued in January 2019. It has a population of around 4,000.

References

 

2019 establishments in Cambodia
Populated places in Sihanoukville province
Cities in Cambodia 
Islands of Cambodia 
Sihanoukville (city)
Populated places established in 2019